Enga may refer to:

Enga Province, Papua New Guinea
Enga people, ethnic group located in the highlands of Papua New Guinea
Enga language, language spoken by Enga people
Enga Sign Language, used among the Enga
Vålerenga I.F. Fotball, a Norwegian association football team

Language and nationality disambiguation pages